Umm Bel is a town in North Kurdufan State in central Sudan, about 170 kilometres west of El Obeid, and north of En Nahud.
Acacia tortilis grows in the vicinity.

References

Populated places in North Kurdufan